The Design 1027 ship (full name Emergency Fleet Corporation Design 1027) was a steel-hulled cargo ship design approved for production by the United States Shipping Boards Emergency Fleet Corporation (EFT) in World War I. They were referred to as the Oscar Daniels-type as all the ships were built at the Oscar Daniels Shipbuilding Company, Tampa, Florida . A total of 10 ships were ordered and built from 1919–1921.

References

Bibliography

External links
 EFC Design 1027: Illustrations

Standard ship types of the United States
 
Design 1027 ships of the United States Navy